Monema is a genus of moths of the family Limacodidae.

Distribution
The genus is distributed in Nepal, Bhutan, China, Far East of Russia, Korea, Japan and northern Vietnam.

Species
Monema coralina Dudgeon, 1895

Monema flavescens Walker, 1855
Monema meyi Solovyev & Witt, 2009
Monema tanaognatha Wu & Pan, 2013

References 

 , 2009: The Limacodidae of Vietnam. Entomofauna Supplement 16: 33-229.

Limacodidae genera
Limacodidae
Taxa named by Francis Walker (entomologist)
Moths of Asia